"If I Thought You'd Ever Change Your Mind" (also recorded as "(I Will Bring You) Flowers in the Morning") is a song that was originally performed by Edwards Hand, written by John Cameron. The song has been covered by many musicians, including Cilla Black in 1969, Sammy Babitzin in 1970 (in Finnish), and Agnetha Fältskog in 2004.

Charts

Agnetha Fältskog version

In 2004, the song was covered by Agnetha Fältskog of Swedish pop group ABBA. It was released as the first single from her ninth solo album, My Colouring Book (2004), and was her first single release in 17 years. Her recording reached number two in Sweden and number 11 in the United Kingdom, becoming her highest-charting single in the UK since her English solo recording career commenced in 1983.

Track listings
 CD-single "blue edition"
 "If I Thought You'd Ever Change Your Mind" [Album-Version] 3:15
 "If I Thought You'd Ever Change Your Mind" [Blue-Mix] 2:55

 CD-Maxi-single "red edition"
 "If I Thought You'd Ever Change Your Mind" [Album-Version] 3:15
 "If I Thought You'd Ever Change Your Mind" [Almighty Mix] 7:10
 "If I Thought You'd Ever Change Your Mind" [Almighty Dub] 7:09

 CD-Maxi-single "yellow edition"
 "If I Thought You'd Ever Change Your Mind" [Album-Version] 3:15
 "If I Thought You'd Ever Change Your Mind" [Almighty Mix] 7:10
 "If I Thought You'd Ever Change Your Mind" [Almighty Dub] 7:09
 "If I Thought You'd Ever Change Your Mind" [Almighty Radio Edit] 3:55

Charts

Weekly charts

Year-end charts

References

1969 singles
1969 songs
2004 singles
Cilla Black songs
Agnetha Fältskog songs
Song recordings produced by George Martin
Songs written by John Cameron (musician)